The 1971 Critérium du Dauphiné Libéré was the 23rd edition of the cycle race and was held from 18 May to 23 May 1971. The race started in Avignon and finished at Montceau-les-Mines. The race was won by Eddy Merckx of the Molteni team.

Teams
Nine teams, containing a total of 90 riders, participated in the race:

Route

General classification

References

Further reading

1971
1971 in French sport
1971 Super Prestige Pernod
May 1971 sports events in Europe